The 1987–88 Southern Football League season was the 85th in the history of the league, an English football competition.

Aylesbury United won the Premier Division and earned promotion to the Football Conference, whilst Chatham Town, Paget Rangers and Shepshed Charterhouse left the league at the end of the season.

Premier Division
The Premier Division consisted of 22 clubs, including 16 clubs from the previous season and six new clubs:
Two clubs promoted from the Midland Division:
Leicester United
VS Rugby

Two clubs promoted from the Southern Division:
Ashford Town (Kent)
Dorchester Town

Plus:
Nuneaton Borough, demoted from the Football Conference
Burton Albion, transferred from the Northern Premier League

League table

Midland Division
The Midland Division expanded up to 22 clubs, including 17 clubs from the previous season and five new clubs:
Two clubs relegated from the Premier Division:
Dudley Town
King's Lynn

Plus:
Atherstone United, promoted from the West Midlands (Regional) League
Paget Rangers, promoted from the Midland Combination
Trowbridge Town, transferred from the Southern Division

League table

Southern Division
The Southern Division expanded up to 21 clubs, including 16 clubs from the previous season and five new clubs:
Two clubs relegated from the Premier Division:
Folkestone
Salisbury

Plus:
Baldock Town, promoted from the United Counties League
Bury Town, promoted from the Eastern Counties League
Hounslow, promoted from the Hellenic League

League table

See also
Southern Football League
1987–88 Isthmian League
1987–88 Northern Premier League

References
RSSF – Southern Football League archive

Southern Football League seasons
6